"Road Tested" (2003–2005) is a live album by Sage Francis. It is a compilation of tracks recorded from the Live Band Dead Poet Tour (with Gruvis Malt, 2003), the Fuck Clear Channel Tour (with The Gimme Fund, 2004) and the 2005 tour with Sol.iLLaquists Of Sound. Some of the tracks recorded with Gruvis Malt in 2003 appeared on Francis' previous live album Dead Poet, Live Album, however the versions appearing on this album have been cleaned up, featuring basslines performed by Mikal kHill (of The ThoughtCriminals) or Arit Harvanko.

Track listing

References

Sage Francis albums
2005 live albums
2005 compilation albums
Strange Famous Records live albums